Ceyda is a Turkish female given name.

Given name
Ceyda Aktaş (born 1994), Turkish volleyball player
Ceyda Ateş (born 1988), Turkish actor
Ceyda Aslı Kılıçkıran (born 1968), Turkish screenwriter and film director
Ceyda Kozluca (born 1984), Turkish basketball player
Ceyda Sungur (born 1986), Turkish academician and activist.

References

Turkish feminine given names